Arthur Roberts may refer to:
 Archie Roberts (American football) (born 1942), cardiac surgeon and American football player
 Arthur J. Roberts (1870–1956), 14th President of Colby College
 Arthur Roberts (actor) (born 1938), American actor
 Arthur Roberts (British Army officer) (1870–1917)
 Arthur Roberts (comedian) (1852–1933), British music hall entertainer and actor
 Arthur Roberts (film editor) (1890–1961), American film editor
 Arthur Spencer Roberts (1920–1997), British wildlife painter
 Arthur Roberts (cricketer) (1874–1961), English cricketer
 Arthur Roberts (footballer, born 1876) (1876–?), English football player for Stoke
 Arthur Roberts (footballer, born 1907) (1907–1957), English football player
 Arthur Roberts (Australian footballer) (1911–1984), Australian rules footballer
 Arthur Roberts (physicist) (1912–2004), American physicist and composer

See also
 Robert Arthur (disambiguation)